Micraeschus elataria is a moth of the family Erebidae first described by Francis Walker in 1861. It is found in Sri Lanka, Taiwan, Peninsular Malaysia, Singapore, Java and Borneo.

References

External links
Description of a new species of Enispa Walker, 1866 (Lepidoptera: Erebidae, Boletobiinae) from Thailand

Moths of Asia
Moths described in 1861
Boletobiinae